Varshons is the ninth studio album and is an album of covers by alternative rock band the Lemonheads. On 27 March 2009, it was announced that Varshons would be released in the US on 23 June on The End Records. It was promoted with a US tour throughout June 2009, and a UK tour in September 2009. Between January and March 2010, Dando went on a US tour.

Produced by Butthole Surfers frontman Gibby Haynes, the album features a variety of tracks from GG Allin, Wire, Leonard Cohen, and Christina Aguilera. Guest performances include vocals from actress Liv Tyler on Leonard Cohen's "Hey, That's No Way to Say Goodbye", and model Kate Moss guests on Arling & Cameron's "Dirty Robot". The Only Ones guitarist John Perry guests on five tracks.

The cover art is by Mark Dagley. The front cover resembles a Spirograph design, while the rear cover is an homage to the back cover of Never Mind the Bollocks, Here's the Sex Pistols.

Online editions of the album feature a bonus track, a cover of Tim Hardin's "How Can We Hang On to a Dream".

Track listing

References

2009 albums
Covers albums
The Lemonheads albums